Roberto Alfonso Delgado (born 7 May 1986) is a Spanish footballer who plays for Italian Eccellenza club Fiano Romano.

Statistics accurate as of match played 3 August 2010

Career Honours 

 Cupa României
 Runner-up: 2010

External links
 
 
 Roberto Delgado at TuttoCampo

1986 births
Living people
Spanish footballers
Spanish expatriate footballers
People from Tenerife
Sportspeople from the Province of Santa Cruz de Tenerife
Association football forwards
FC Delta Dobrogea Tulcea players
S.S. Lazio players
S.P.A.L. players
FC Vaslui players
FC Universitatea Cluj players
Potenza S.C. players
U.S. Pergolettese 1932 players
U.S. Palestrina 1919 players
Serie A players
Serie D players
Eccellenza players
Liga I players
Spanish expatriate sportspeople in Italy
Spanish expatriate sportspeople in Romania
Expatriate footballers in Italy
Expatriate footballers in Romania